Leptostomum is a genus of mosses belonging to the family Bryaceae. It has also been classified in the monotypic family Leptostomataceae.R. Br..

The species of this genus are found in Europe, Australasia and Northern America.

Species:
 Leptostomum celebicum Broth. 
 Leptostomum densum Thwaites & Mitten, 1873 
 Leptostomum inclinans R.Br.

References

Bryopsida
Moss genera